Chemmanathukara is a small place in Vaikom Village, Kottayam District, Kerala, India.

Demographics
There are two communities here, Hindus and Christians. They live in harmony. There are two main temples, Chemmanathu Krishna Temple and sreenarayaneshvarapuram Muruga Temple, and one main church, St. Antony's Church.

Administration
Chemmanathukara is part of T.V. Puram Panchayat (Thirumani Venkitapuram Panchayat).

Geography
Chemmanathukara is a place which is on the lap of "Kariyar" which is a subsidiary of Vembanadu Lake.

Transportation
"Kadathu" or transportation via small boats were one of the means of transportation used earlier to travel to Kottayam city.

Organisations

Sarga Kailrali is a registered arts and sports club in Chemmanathukara which conducts arts and sports festivals and Onam celebrations annually.

Kadavil Brothers is a team of youths who conduct different cultural and religious activities.
  
KCYM Unit Chemmanathukara is run by the energetic youth of St. Antony's Church Chemmanathukara.

St. George Hospital (Parekattu) is run by Sisters of Destitutes.

Schools
 Govt. U.P. School Chemmanathukara

References

Villages in Kottayam district